Abū Zayd al-Dabūsī; he is Abd Allāh, or Ubaid Allāh ibn Umar ibn ‘Īsa al-Dabūsi al-Bukhārī Hanafī al-Qadī; a founding jurist and most eminent scholar of the Hanafī school in the eleventh century. His reputation for learning was proverbial.  He established the science of dialectics supporting his analysis and argument on examples extracted from scripture.  He composed several taalīkas.  Among his writings were Asrār ('Mysteries')  and the Takwīm lil Adilla (‘system of demonstrations’) .   Ad-Dabūsi died in the city of Bukhara in 430 AH / 1038-9.

The name Dabūsi derives from the town Dabūsiya, which lies between Bukhāra and Samarkand, and from where a number of scholars hailed.

Sources

Kitāb Wafayāt al-Ayān  by Ibn Khallikān; vol.II, p. 28

Al-Bidayah wa’l-Nihāyat by Ibn Kathīr vol.12, p. 46

Shuḍrāt al-ḍahab by Ibn al-‘Amād al-Hanbali vol.3, p. 245

Al-Fawā’id al-Baḥīa by Abd al-Hayy al-Lucknawi  p. 109

See also

List of Arab scientists and scholars
Encyclopædia Britannica Online

Notes

References

Hanafis
Maturidis
1038 deaths
11th-century Muslim theologians